Veron ka Math is the originating point of Banas River, situated in the Kumbhalgarh block of Rajsamand district in the state of Rajasthan. It is 8 km west of the Kumbhalgarh on the NH 162 Ext. There is a Shiva temple and other deities in the temple complex.

See also 
 Kumbhalgarh Wildlife Sanctuary

References

External links 
 Kumbhalgarh Fort of Rajasthan

Geography of Rajasthan
Hinduism in India
Rajsamand district